The 1909 Cork City by-election was held on 1 May 1909.  The by-election was held due to the resignation of the incumbent Irish Parliamentary MP, William O'Brien.  It was won by the All-for-Ireland candidate Maurice Healy.

Cosbie was associated with the United Irish League wing of Irish Nationalism.

References

Elections in Cork (city)
By-elections to the Parliament of the United Kingdom in County Cork constituencies
1909 elections in the United Kingdom
1909 elections in Ireland